Elections to Cookstown District Council were held on 15 May 1985 on the same day as the other Northern Irish local government elections. The election used three district electoral areas to elect a total of 16 councillors.

Election results

Note: "Votes" are the first preference votes.

Districts summary

|- class="unsortable" align="centre"
!rowspan=2 align="left"|Ward
! % 
!Cllrs
! % 
!Cllrs
! %
!Cllrs
! %
!Cllrs
! % 
!Cllrs
!rowspan=2|TotalCllrs
|- class="unsortable" align="center"
!colspan=2 bgcolor="" | DUP
!colspan=2 bgcolor="" | Sinn Féin
!colspan=2 bgcolor="" | UUP
!colspan=2 bgcolor="" | SDLP
!colspan=2 bgcolor="white"| Others
|-
|align="left"|Ballinderry
|26.5
|2
|bgcolor="#008800"|29.3
|bgcolor="#008800"|2
|18.2
|1
|25.3
|1
|0.7
|0
|6
|-
|align="left"|Cookstown Central
|bgcolor="#D46A4C"|31.8
|bgcolor="#D46A4C"|2
|15.6
|1
|25.7
|1
|18.9
|1
|8.0
|0
|5
|-
|align="left"|Drum Manor
|21.8
|1
|bgcolor="#008800"|30.8
|bgcolor="#008800"|1
|20.3
|1
|17.7
|1
|9.4
|1
|5
|- class="unsortable" class="sortbottom" style="background:#C9C9C9"
|align="left"| Total
|26.6
|5
|25.6
|4
|21.1
|3
|21.0
|3
|5.7
|1
|16
|-
|}

District results

Ballinderry

1985: 2 x DUP, 2 x Sinn Féin, 1 x SDLP, 1 x UUP

Cookstown Central

1985: 2 x DUP, 1 x UUP, 1 x SDLP, 1 x Sinn Féin

Drum Manor

1985: 1 x Sinn Féin, 1 x DUP, 1 x UUP, 1 x SDLP, 1 x Independent Unionist

References

Cookstown District Council elections
Cookstown